Benjamin Bussey (17571842) was a prosperous merchant, farmer, horticulturalist and patriot in Boston, Massachusetts, United States,  who made significant contributions to the creation of the Arnold Arboretum.  He was said to be "a man of excellent business capacity."

Personal life
Bussey was born in 1757 on a farm in what is today Canton, Massachusetts, before it separated from Stoughton. He received only a basic education. After serving in the American Revolutionary War, Bussey moved to Dedham, Massachusetts. He married Judith Gay of Dedham in 1780.

Bussey owned land in what is now the Forest Hills area of Jamaica Plain. In 1800, he inherited additional land from fellow patriot Eleazer Weld and further enlarged his estate between 1806 and 1837 by acquiring and consolidating various farms that had been established as early as the seventeenth century. His estate was known as "Woodland Hill". Bussey wrote an autobiography. He died in 1842.

A bust of him at the Harvard Art Museums was made in 1830 by Shobal Vail Clevenger.

Career
Bussey opened a gold and silversmith shop in Dedham, Massachusetts in 1778 where he made spurs, spoons, and other objects from metal. He learned the trade from a Hessian soldier. As his business on East Street prospered, he soon added general merchandise.  Between 1778 and 1790, Bussey accumulated $25,000 (roughly $700,000 in 2020 dollars). Bussey took the $25,000 he made to Boston in 1790 where he ran a shipping and trading company for 16 years at five different locations. He lived in a town house in the central part of the city. As a businessman, he almost never accepted or asked for credit, preferring to operate in cash only.

In 1806, at the age of 49, he retired as one of the richest men in New England to a life raising Merino sheep on a 300-acre farm in Roxbury. On his estate, which featured wallpaper views of Paris and French furniture, Bussey practiced scientific farming.

He left retirement at the age of 62 to return to Dedham where he purchased the Norfolk Cotton Manufacturing Company on Maverick Street along Mother Brook.  The War of 1812 had brought ruin to the company, and he purchased it in 1819 for a sum far below cost. Bussey used the wool from his sheep, producing a high caliber product that sold well.

Bussey then bought a failed woollen mill from the Dedham Worsted Company only three years after they opened on the street that now bears his name. There he combined spinning and weaving under the same roof, creating one of New England's first integrated textile mills. Bussey brought in the best equipment, and refurbished many of the old buildings.  He was one of the first to install water-powered broad looms, enabling him to spin and weave the raw wool into finished fabric. It was said that the factories, dye houses, dwellings, and other buildings associated with the operation "of themselves constitute a little village."

Bussey also bought vast tracts of land in Maine, and had a number of other business interests, including a private bank.

Electoral career
Bussey ran for a seat in the Massachusetts Senate in 1807, but lost. He was successful running in 1808 as a Federalist for the Massachusetts House of Representatives in 1808 and 1809.

Bequests
Bussey, according to the minister of the Canton church, was to "live of life gilded misery, give to Harvard College what must now amount to a million dollars, because he could not carry it with him; and to the Hollis Street Church a set of the Ten Commandments, because he could not keep them with him." Though he called his mills along Mother Brook to be his most "valuable and productive property]], he did not give any large sums of money to causes in Dedham.

He bequeathed his land and part of his fortune to Harvard University "for instruction in agriculture, horticulture, and related subjects". Harvard used this land for the creation of the Bussey Institute, which was dedicated to agricultural experimentation. The first Bussey Institute building was completed in 1871 and served as headquarters for an undergraduate school of agriculture. One half of the income from Bussey's estates and property endowed professorships and scholarships in the Harvard Divinity School and the Harvard Law School, while the other half supported the institute.

Sixteen years after Bussey's death, James Arnold, a New Bedford, Massachusetts whaling merchant, specified that a portion of his estate was to be used for "...the promotion of Agricultural, or Horticultural improvements". In 1872, when the trustees of the will of James Arnold transferred his estate to Harvard University, Arnold's gift was combined with 120 acres (0.5 km2) of the former Bussey estate to create the Arnold Arboretum.

The arboretum's Bussey Hill and Bussey Brook (formerly Sawmill Brook), and the adjacent Bussey Street still bear his name. Bussey Street in Dedham, Massachusetts, where he owned mills, is also named for him.  A plaster bust of Bussey by Shobal Vail Clevenger, 1830, is housed at the Dedham Historical Society and Museum. A marble copy is in the collection of the Harvard Art Museums, as is a portrait painted by Gilbert Stuart in 1809. Watercolor portraits of Bussey and his wife painted by Henry Inman in 1830 are at the Boston Museum of Fine Arts. Silver by Bussey is in various collections.

Notes

References

Works cited

External links
 Benjamin Bussey collection, William L. Clements Library, University of Michigan.
The Arnold Arboretum of Harvard University
Jamaica Plain Historical Society, "Weld Family"

1757 births
1842 deaths
People from colonial Boston
Businesspeople from Dedham, Massachusetts
Harvard University people
Arnold Arboretum
American philanthropists
Colonial American merchants
Patriots in the American Revolution
United States military personnel of the American Revolution
Members of the Massachusetts House of Representatives